The  is a high-speed Shinkansen train service operated by East Japan Railway Company (JR East) on the Hokuriku Shinkansen in Japan. The shinkansen service was introduced in October 1997, but the name was first used for a semi-express service operated by Japanese National Railways (JNR) in 1961.　"Asama" is the name of an active volcano (Mount Asama) near Karuizawa, on the boundary between Gunma and Nagano Prefecture.

Operations

Train formations
Asama services are operated using 12-car E7 series or W7 series trainsets formed as shown below, with car 1 at the Tokyo end. Car 11 is a "Green" car, and car 12 is a "Gran Class" car with 2+1 seating. Unlike on Tohoku Shinkansen Hayabusa services, however, a dedicated attendant service is not provided in Gran Class cars on Asama services. All cars are no-smoking.

Rolling stock
 E7 series 12-car F sets (since 15 March 2014)
 W7 series 12-car W sets (since 14 March 2015)

Services were initially operated using a dedicated fleet of fourteen 8-car E2 series "N" sets based at Nagano Shinkansen Depot.

New E7 series 12-car sets, also based at Nagano Depot, were introduced on Asama services from the start of the revised timetable on 15 March 2014. These trains include "Gran Class" seating arranged 2+1 abreast. E7 series trainsets were initially used on seven return services daily, with a further four return workings added from 19 April 2014. JR West W7 series 12-car sets, based at Hakusan Depot, were introduced from the start of the revised timetable on 14 March 2015.

Former rolling stock
 E2 series 8-car J sets (from 1 October 1997 until 2002)
 E2 series 8-car N sets (from 1 October 1997 until 31 March 2017)
 200 series 12-car F80 set (February 1998 only)
 E4 series 8-car P50/P80 sets, as Max Asama

Pre-shinkansen

 181 series EMU sets (October 1966–)
 189 series EMU 9/11/12-car sets (October 1975–September 1997)
 489 series EMU sets

History

Semi-express Asama
The name Asama was first introduced on 1 March 1961 for  services operating between Nagano and Niigata. This service operated until 30 November 1962, after which the train was renamed . From 1 December 1962, the name was used for the semi-express services operating between Ueno in Tokyo and Nagano on the Shinetsu Line. This service continued until 30 September 1963, after which the train was renamed .

Limited express Asama

After a gap of three years, the name Asama was re-introduced from 1 October 1966 on the Limited express services operating between Ueno and Nagano or Naoetsu. By the late 1990s, there were 29 workings daily in each direction, formed of 9- or 11-car 189 series EMU formations. During the busy summer periods, a second Green car was sometimes added to increase formations to 12 cars.

The typical 11-car 189 series formation in 1995 was as shown below, with car 1 at the Ueno end.

Shinkansen Asama

During the 1998 Winter Olympics in February 1998, additional services were provided using one specially modified 200 series train (set F80), limited to a maximum speed of 210 km/h. Four E4 series double-decker "Max" trains (sets P51/52 and P81/82) were also specially built for seasonal use on the Nagano Shinkansen as Max Asama services, but only two (sets P81 and P82) are capable of travelling as far as Nagano because the line west of Karuizawa runs on a 60 Hz power supply, unlike the rest of the line that runs on a 50 Hz power supply.

From the start of the revised timetable on 10 December 2005, Asama services were made entirely no-smoking.

The services operated using E2 series eight-car sets (until 31 March 2017) were formed as follows. Car 7 was a "Green" (first class) car. All cars were no-smoking.

From the start of the revised timetable on 15 March 2014, new E7 series 12-car trainsets were introduced on Asama services. Initially used on seven return services daily, this number was increased to eleven return services daily from 19 April 2014.

Following the opening of the Hokuriku Shinkansen extension beyond Nagano to Kanazawa in 2015, the Asama name continued to be used for those services operating between Tokyo and Nagano, with some services still operated by 8-car E2 series trains.

The last services operated using eight-car E2 series trainsets ran on 31 March 2017, from which date all Asama services were formed of E7 and W7 series trainsets.

See also
 List of named passenger trains of Japan

References

External links

 JR East E7 series Asama 

Railway services introduced in 1961
East Japan Railway Company
Named Shinkansen trains